Davidson Bradfute Penn (1836 - 1902) was a Confederate officer in the American Civil War and a politician in Louisiana. He briefly served as lieutenant governor of Louisiana in 1872.

Charles Conrad Jr. married his sister.

A carte de visite photograph of him survives.

References

1836 births
1902 deaths
Lieutenant Governors of Louisiana
Confederate States Army officers